Coughtrey Peninsula is a small hook-shaped peninsula at the north side of the entrance to Skontorp Cove, Paradise Harbor, on the west coast of Graham Land. It was first mapped as an island in 1913–14 by Scottish geologist David Ferguson, who named it "Coughtrey Island". The feature is, however, a peninsula and the site of the Almirante Brown Station, established by Argentina in 1949–50.

References
 

Peninsulas of Graham Land
Danco Coast